The South County Museum is a non-profit museum in Narragansett, Rhode Island.

History
South County Museum was founded in 1933 in North Kingstown and the original collections were held in a barn in Wickford. After a year, the museum moved to the Knight Farm on Scrabbletown Road in North Kingstown. 

In 1984, the museum moved to its current location on Canonchet Farm in Narragansett, which was previously owned by Col. William Sprague, a former governor of Rhode Island. 

The South County Museum contains artifacts dating from the 17th century to modern times.

See also
 List of museums in Rhode Island

References

External links
 South County Museum Official Website

Buildings and structures in Narragansett, Rhode Island
Museums established in 1933
Museums in Washington County, Rhode Island
History museums in Rhode Island
Living museums in the United States